Daniel Sonenberg (born 1970) is an American composer and performer.

Sonenberg was born in Manhattan, New York in 1970, and moved to Maine in 2004. As a composer, he is best known for his opera The Summer King. His work Baseball Songs won the Robert Starer Competition Prize. He composed First Light: A Fanfare for Maine for performance by the Portland Symphony Orchestra at the Maine bicentennial celebrations.

Sonenberg is a member of a rock band, Lovers of Fiction, and has also released a solo album, Peaks Island Ferry. He is a professor at the University of Southern Maine.

References

Further reading
Ben Meiklejohn (12 March 2007). "In the right field", The Boston Phoenix.

External links

Profile, New Music USA

1970 births
Living people
American classical composers 
American opera composers 
21st-century American composers
University of Southern Maine faculty